Saloca kulczynskii is a species of spider that can be found in such European countries as Czech Republic, Hungary, Poland, Romania, and Slovakia.

References

kulczynskii
Spiders of Europe
Spiders described in 1939